Baghaawat – Ek Jung is a 2001 Action film directed and produced by Deepak Pawar, starring Mithun Chakraborty, Aditya Pancholi, Mohan Joshi, Shahbaz Khan and Deepak Shirke.

Plot 
Krishna (Mithun Chakraborty) and Arjun (Aditya Pancholi) work for two mafia leaders whose gangs are fighting an implacable war for control of the city. Krishna's sister Kiran(Manvi Goswami) and Arjuna's brother Sidarch (Anshul Nagar) love each other and, knowing of the brothers ' enmity, decide to reconcile them. The resulting truce between the militants does not suit their bosses. They decide to kill the lovers.

Cast
Mithun Chakraborty as Krishna
Aditya Pancholi as Arjun
Shahbaz Khan as Police inspector Vijay
Manvi Goswami as Kiran
Anshul Nagar as Sidarch
Mohan Joshi as Vishawnath
Rutika Singh as Mary
Deepak Shirke as David
Ishrat Ali as minister
Razak Khan as Rangila
Dinesh Hingoo as Bhola

Soundtrack
"Mera Dil Ullu Da Pattha" Mohammed Aziz, Chandana Dixit 
"Bhakton Ki Toli" Mohammed Aziz, Sukhwinder Singh

References

External links
 
 Full Hyderabad review

2001 films
2000s Hindi-language films
Mithun's Dream Factory films
Films shot in Ooty
Indian action films
2001 action films